Malleus (Latin for "hammer") is a bone in the middle ear.

Malleus may also refer to:
 Malleus (bivalve), a genus of bivalves
 Malleus (disease), a bacterial infection

See also 
 Malleus Maleficarum (Hammer of Witches), an early modern European treatise on witches
 Malleus Scotorum ("Hammer of the Scots"), byname of King Edward I of England
 Malleolus, a structure in mammalian skeletal anatomy
 Malleolus (arthropod), an external organ chemoreceptor found in Solpugidae